Abraham van Olst (24 September 1897, Amsterdam – 9 April 1964, Amsterdam) was a Dutch water polo player who competed in the 1928 Summer Olympics. He was part of the Dutch team in the 1928 tournament. He played both matches as goalkeeper.

See also
 Netherlands men's Olympic water polo team records and statistics
 List of men's Olympic water polo tournament goalkeepers

References

External links
 

1897 births
1964 deaths
Dutch male water polo players
Water polo goalkeepers
Water polo players at the 1928 Summer Olympics
Olympic water polo players of the Netherlands
Water polo players from Amsterdam